Lohmanniidae is a family of oribatids in the order Oribatida. There are at least 20 genera and 180 described species in Lohmanniidae.

Genera

References

Further reading

 
 
 
 

Acariformes
Acari families